Ergoteles or Ergotelis, was a native of Knossos and Olympic runner in the Ancient Olympic Games.

Civil disorder (ancient Greek: Stasis) had compelled him to leave Crete. He came to Sicily and was naturalized as a citizen of Himera. He won the Olympic dolichos ("long race") of 472 BC and 464 BC, as well as winning twice in both Pythian and Isthmian Games.

A four-line inscribed epigram of c. 450 BC found in Olympia commemorates the six Ergotelian victories. The base of an inscribed statue at Olympia, which was seen and exploited by the geographer Pausanias, was rediscovered in 1953. Pindar honoured Ergoteles with the following Epinikion hymn:

Namesake  
The Gymnastics Club Ergotelis established in 1929 in Heraklion, Crete, was named after Ergoteles, in commemoration of the first Olympic champion native to the modern Heraklion prefecture.

References

5th-century BC Greek people
Ancient Knossians
Ancient Greek runners
Ancient Cretan athletes
Ancient Himeraeans
Ancient Olympic competitors
Ancient Pythian athletes